Felix Alemao (born 20 July 1995) is an Indian cricketer. He made his first-class debut for Goa in the 2016–17 Ranji Trophy on 13 October 2016. He made his List A debut for Goa in the 2016–17 Vijay Hazare Trophy on 28 February 2017.

References

External links
 

1995 births
Living people
Indian cricketers
Goa cricketers